Matthew Bolton (born 7 July 1979 in Perth, WA) is an Australian billiards player. He is one of the most successful English billiards players of his country. Internationally, he is also successful as a snooker player where he became professional in 2017.

Career 
Between 2000 and 2017 Matthew Bolton was the 15-time winner of the Australian National Billiards Championship and unbeaten from 2004 on (in 2012 he could not participate). He is the most successful billiards player in his country since Bob Marshall who won 21 titles. In 2011 and 2012 he was runner-up in the respective world championships and world number 1 in the 2012/2013 season.

Bolton also became the national snooker champion in 2014. He qualified for the World Snooker Tour by winning the 2017 OBSF Oceanian Snooker Championship. He defeated Ben Judge 6–3 in the final. He did not win a match on the main tour and resigned his tour place in August 2018.

Performance and rankings timeline

References

External links

Australian snooker players
Living people
1979 births
Australian players of English billiards